Juan Sandoval may refer to:
Juan Sandoval Íñiguez (born 1933), Roman Catholic cardinal
Juan Sandoval (baseball) (born 1981), baseball pitcher with the Tampa Bay Rays